Stephen Kampyongo (born 12 June 1972) is a Zambian politician who is the former Minister of Home Affairs of Zambia as of 2021. He was the Minister of Local Government and Housing in the first cabinet of Edgar Lungu after his election in 2015 following the death of Michael Sata.

He is a member of the Patriotic Front party.

References 

Living people
Patriotic Front (Zambia) politicians
Home Affairs ministers of Zambia
Local government ministers of Zambia
1972 births